Anam Kazim (born 1986) is a Canadian politician who was elected in the 2015 Alberta general election to the Legislative Assembly of Alberta representing the electoral district of Calgary-Glenmore.

On election night, the count of ballots left Kazim and incumbent MLA Linda Johnson in an exact tie of 7,015 votes each. Kazim was officially declared elected on May 15 after a recount.

Prior to serving with the Legislative Assembly, she spent two years as an applications engineer for an industrial pump manufacturer. Before that, she worked for two years as the director of training programs for an education and training centre that specialized in project management. She also spent close to five years working with Western University, where she obtained her postsecondary education, first as a teaching assistant and later as a research assistant.

Kazim holds a master's degree in biochemical/environmental engineering, a bachelor's degree in chemical engineering and is certified in conflict resolution.

Kazim lost the NDP nomination for Calgary-Glenmore to Jordan Stein in February 2019, and did not run in the 2019 Alberta general election.

Electoral history

2015 general election

References

1986 births
Alberta New Democratic Party MLAs
Living people
Politicians from Calgary
Women MLAs in Alberta
21st-century Canadian politicians
21st-century Canadian women politicians
Canadian engineers
Canadian politicians of Pakistani descent
Pakistani emigrants to Canada
Naturalized citizens of Canada